Meledinskaya is a rural locality (a village) and the administrative center of Verkhneustkuloyskoye Rural Settlement, Velsky District, Arkhangelsk Oblast, Russia. The population was 296 as of 2010.

Geography 
Meledinskaya is located 27 km southeast of Velsk (the district's administrative centre) by road. Makoveyevo is the nearest rural locality.

References 

Rural localities in Velsky District